The Bob Clarke Trophy is awarded annually to the player who leads the Western Hockey League in points scoring during the regular season. In both years Bob Clarke played in the WHL, he captured the League scoring title. In 1968-69, Clarke’s Flin Flon Bombers captured the League Championship. His NHL career spanned 15 seasons with the Philadelphia Flyers, in which time he captained the team to a pair of Stanley Cups. He was awarded the Hart Trophy as the League’s MVP three times, the Masterton Trophy and the Selke Trophy once each, and was also named an All-Star four times. He was inducted into the Hockey Hall of Fame in 1987.

Previously, the Bob Brownridge Trophy. Brownridge was a Calgary businessman and owner of the Calgary Centennials of the WHL. In 1971, he secured a World Hockey Association franchise for Calgary, to be called the Broncos. However before team played a game Brownridge unexpectedly died and the team could not continue. The trophy was simply known as the Brownridge Trophy before his death in 1972.

List of winners

Blue background denotes also won CHL Top Scorer Award
1The WHL handed out separate awards for the East and West divisions.

See also
CHL Top Scorer Award
Eddie Powers Memorial Trophy - Top scorer of the Ontario Hockey League
Jean Béliveau Trophy - Top scorer of the Quebec Major Junior Hockey League

References

Western Hockey League trophies and awards
Awards established in 1966